Osięciny  is a village in Radziejów County, Kuyavian-Pomeranian Voivodeship, in north-central Poland. It is the seat of the gmina (administrative district) called Gmina Osięciny.

In 2006 the village had a population of 2700.

Jews in Osieciny

After the First World War there were 450 Jews in the village. In Osieciny were Jewish social aid institutions and branches of the Zionist parties and Agudat Israel. The Germans occupied Osieciny in September 1939. Community Judenrat was established and its main role was to provide forced workers. A ghetto was established in 1940 in the village. In April 1942, the Jews were gathered in the church and from there they were sent to Chelmno extermination camp.

Extensive documentation of Jewish life before the Holocaust in Osieciny is in a book by Rafael Olewski - "The Tear" [Hebrew], 1983, Tel-Aviv. Rafael Olewski was born in Osieciny in 1914, and his uncle was the last rabbi of the Jewish community.

The synagogue is still standing, neglected and used by a commercial company. Beit HaMidrash is standing next to him and is used for other purposes. "Jewish Street" changed his name. The Rabbi house is occupied by non-Jewish residents of the town, as well as other houses of Jews. Jewish cemetery was desecrated by the Nazis, and tombstones were stolen by the Poles after the Holocaust and became stone pavement. The Cemetery now is occupied by a private person, and when telephone technicians dug there, bones and skulls were uncovered at a depth of only 30 cm... Beyond that there is no sign, monument or other memorial means for the Jewish ex-residents of the town. They faded and disappeared.

References

 Rafael Olewski - "The Tear", [Hebrew], 1983, Tel-Aviv, .
 The updated list of names of the Jews in Osieciny as from 1939 [and earlier] until the annihilation of the whole community in April 1942, by Arie Olewski, Herzliya, Israel.

Villages in Radziejów County
Holocaust locations in Poland